Aleksandr Mihaylovich Trofimov (11 September 1937 – 6 September 2002) was a Soviet and Azerbaijani footballer who played midfield 11 years for Neftchi Baku PFC.  Trofimov later coached Neftchi and Araz Nakhchivan in the 1970s.

Born in Baku, Azerbaijan SSR, Trofimov began playing professional football with FC Trudovye Reservy Lipetsk in the Soviet Second League and the Soviet First League from 1957 to 1960.

He was classified as a Master of Sport of the USSR in 1963 and was a member of the Neftchi squad that finished third in the Soviet Top League in 1966.

After he retired from playing, Trofimov coached his former club Neftchi before becoming a manager. He led Avtomobilist Mingechevir in the Soviet Second League during 1987 and Plastik Salyan FK in the Azerbaijan Top League during 1992.

He would return to Lipetsk, where he worked with a local club FC Spartak Kazinka before he died in 2002.

References

External links
Profile at Footballfacts.ru

Lipetsk News: Trofimov, Flying Azerbaijani 

1937 births
2002 deaths
Russian footballers
Soviet footballers
Azerbaijani footballers
Azerbaijani football managers
Honoured Masters of Sport of the USSR
FC Metallurg Lipetsk players
Association football midfielders
Neftçi PFK players
Footballers from Baku